Phlox (Greek φλόξ "flame"; plural "phlox" or "phloxes", Greek φλόγες phlóges) is a genus of 67 species of perennial and annual plants in the family Polemoniaceae. They are found mostly in North America (one in Siberia) in diverse habitats from alpine tundra to open woodland and prairie. Some flower in spring, others in summer and fall. Flowers may be pale blue, violet, pink, bright red, or white. Many are fragrant.

Description

The name is derived from the Greek word phlox meaning flame in reference to the intense flower colors of some varieties.  Fertilized flowers typically produce one relatively large seed. The fruit is a longitudinally dehiscent capsule with three or more valves that sometimes separate explosively.

Some species such as P. paniculata (garden phlox) grow upright, while others such as P. subulata (moss phlox, moss pink, mountain phlox) grow short and matlike. Paniculata or tall phlox, is a native American wildflower that is native from New York to Iowa south to Georgia, Mississippi and Arkansas. It blooms from July to September.

Creeping phlox spreads rapidly and makes great ground cover. It can be planted to cover banks, fill spaces under tall trees, and spill and trail over slopes. Creeping phlox blooms in spring and produces long, spreading stems, which become woody with age. It was introduced into cultivation by the late 1700s.

The foliage of Phlox is a food for the larvae of some Lepidoptera species including dot moth, Gazoryctra wielgusi, hummingbird hawk-moth and Schinia indiana (which feeds exclusively on P. pilosa).  Phlox species are also a popular food source for groundhogs, rabbits and deer.

Species

The species in the genus include:

Phlox aculeata A. Nelson
Phlox acuminata Pursh
Phlox adsurgens Torr. ex A. Gray
Phlox alaskensis Jordal
Phlox albomarginata M.E. Jones
Phlox alyssifolia Greene
Phlox amabilis Brand
Phlox amoena Sims
Phlox amplifolia Britton
Phlox andicola (Britton) E.E. Nelson
Phlox austromontana Coville
Phlox azurea Glad. L. Sm.
Phlox bifida L.C. Beck
Phlox bryoides Nutt.
Phlox buckleyi Wherry
Phlox caespitosa Nutt.
Phlox canescens Torr. & A. Gray
Phlox carolina L.
Phlox caryophylla Wherry
Phlox cluteana A. Nelson
Phlox colubrina Wherry & Constance
Phlox condensata (A. Gray) E.E. Nelson
Phlox covillei E.E. Nelson
Phlox cuspidata Scheele
Phlox diffusa Benth.
Phlox dispersa Sharsm.
Phlox divaricata L.
Phlox dolichantha A. Gray
Phlox douglasii Hook.
Phlox drummondii Hook.
Phlox floridana Benth.
Phlox glaberrima L.
Phlox glabriflora Whiteh.
Phlox gladiformis (M.E. Jones) E.E. Nelson
Phlox glutinosa Buckley
Phlox grahamii Wherry
Phlox grayi Wooton & Standl.
Phlox griseola Wherry
Phlox hendersonii (E.E. Nelson) Cronquist
Phlox hentzii Nutt.
Phlox hirsuta E.E. Nelson
Phlox hoodii Richardson
Phlox idahonis Wherry
Phlox jonesii Wherry
Phlox kelseyi Britton
Phlox lanata Piper
Phlox lighthipei Small
Phlox linearifolia (Hook.) A. Gray
Phlox longifolia Nutt.
Phlox longipilosa Waterf.
Phlox lutescens (S.L. Welsh) S.L. Welsh
Phlox maculata L.
Phlox mesoleuca Greene
Phlox mollis Wherry
Phlox multiflora A. Nelson
Phlox muscoides Nutt.
Phlox nana Nutt.
Phlox nivalis Lodd.
Phlox oklahomensis Wherry
Phlox ovata L.
Phlox paniculata L.
Phlox pattersonii Prather
Phlox peckii Wherry
Phlox pilosa L.
Phlox pulcherrima (Lundell) Lundell
Phlox pulvinata (Wherry) Cronquist
Phlox pungens Dorn
Phlox richardsonii Hook.
Phlox roemeriana Scheele
Phlox sibirica L.
Phlox speciosa Pursh
Phlox stansburyi (Torr.) A. Heller
Phlox stolonifera Sims
Phlox subulata L.
Phlox suksdorfii (Brand) H. St. John
Phlox superba Brand
Phlox tenuifolia E.E. Nelson
Phlox tenuis (A. Gray) E.E. Nelson
Phlox texensis (Lundell) Lundell
Phlox triovulata Thurb. ex Torr.
Phlox tumulosa Wherry
Phlox viridis E.E. Nelson
Phlox viscida E.E. Nelson
Phlox walteri (A. Gray) Chapm.
Phlox woodhousei (A. Gray) E.E. Nelson

Cultivation

Several species and cultivars of phlox are commonly grown in gardens. Most cultivated phlox, with the notable exception of Phlox drummondii, are perennial. Species from alpine habitats (and cultivars derived from them) require full sun and good drainage. Those from woodland habitats (such as Phlox divaricata) require partial shade and soil rich in humus. Those from waterside habitats (such as P. paniculata) require full sun and moisture at the roots. Phlox are valued in the garden for their ability to attract butterflies. Phlox can be propagated from stem cuttings.

References

Further reading
 Lady Bird Johnson Wildflower Center, University of Texas, Austin
 Natural Resources Conservation Service USDA

External links

 
Garden plants
Polemoniaceae genera